The X12 is a series of two-car electric multiple units operated by Statens Järnvägar (SJ) of Sweden as local trains. Eighteen units were built by Asea Brown Boveri in 1991–94, based on the somewhat older X10. From 1997 until 2003 three units were also used by Upplands Lokaltrafik. Two of the units have been converted to the successor X14. As SJ since 2021 have replaced their X12-trains with X50, X52 and ER1 trains, Västtrafik is currently the only operator of X12.

External links
Järnväg.net on X12 

ABB multiple units
X12
X12
15 kV AC multiple units